Seyyed Jalaleddin Taheri Esfahani (sometimes spelled Jalaluddin Taheri or Jalaleddin Taheri, 1 January 1926 – 2 June 2013) was an Iranian scholar, theologian and Islamic philosopher. He was  a critic of Islamic extremism and was the representative of the Supreme Leader of Iran.

Career
Taheri was a member of Assembly of Experts and representative of Ayatollah Ruhollah Khomeini in Isfahan province. In 2002, Taheri resigned after 30 years as prayer leader in Isfahan. Taheri's resignation letter complained of "generalized corruption of religious power in Iran." On 30 June 2009, Taheri wrote an open letter in which he called Mahmoud Ahmadinejad's presidency illegitimate.

Death
Taheri died on 2 June 2013 at near 5 A.M after 35 days of hospitalization due to Respiratory arrest in one of the Isfahan's hospital. He suffered respiratory disease for a long time. 
"Tens of thousands" attended his funeral in what was reportedly "Iran's biggest anti-government protest for years". Mourners chanted anti-government slogans such as “the political prisoners must freed,” and, “Mousavi and Karroubi must be freed,” calling Supreme Leader Ali Khamenei a dictator. 
He was buried in his hometown in Golestan Shohaha camstry beside his son.

See also
 Mohammad Khatami
 Mohsen Kadivar
 List of Ayatollahs
List of members in the First Term of the Council of Experts

References

1926 births
2013 deaths
Iranian Shia clerics
Iranian reformists
Members of the Assembly of Experts
Burials at Takht-e Foulad